Smithville High School is a public high school located in Smithville, Texas (USA) and classified as a 4A school by the UIL. It is part of the Smithville Independent School District located in southeast Bastrop County. In 2013, the school was rated "Met Standard" by the Texas Education Agency.

Its service area includes Smithville and Rosanky.

Athletics
The Smithville Tigers compete in the following sports 

Baseball
Basketball
Cross Country
Football
Golf
Powerlifting
Softball
Tennis
Track and Field
Volleyball

The Tiger Athletics iconic "T" was designed by Clayton Knight, a 2009 graduate of Smithville High School.

State titles
Smithville (UIL)

Boys Track 
1919(B)

Smithville Brown (PVIL)

Football 
1963(PVIL-1A)

References

External links
Smithville ISD

Schools in Bastrop County, Texas
Public high schools in Texas